Afro puffs are a hair  style usually consisting of two "puffs" of hair, one on each side of the head, like smaller versions of an afro, from which it evolved.

The style is created by parting the hair down the middle and using a hair tie on each side.

Variants include zig-zag partings and multiple puffs.

In popular culture
The song "Afro Puffs" by The Lady of Rage is named after the hairstyle.
On Central Park (TV series), the character Molly Tillerman (voiced by Kristen Bell in season one and Emmy Raver-Lampman from season two and onwards) has the hairstyle. Molly also draws herself in comic books as the superhero Fista-Puffs, who's Afro-Puffs are the source of her powers.

See also
 Pigtail
 List of hairstyles

References

External links

Scalp hairstyles
African-American hair